Han Groo (born Min Han-groo on May 29, 1992) is a South Korean actress and singer.

Early life
Han Groo was born in Namyangju, Gyeonggi Province, South Korea. When she was in fourth grade, her family moved to the United States where she studied at Acacia Elementary School in California, and Ladera Vista Junior High School in California. Han Groo excelled at her academic studies—to the extent that she won a U.S. President's Education Award in 2003. She also had an extensive background in dancing since middle school, winning prizes at several competitions for hip hop dance, jazz dance and tap dance.

After four years in the US, her family moved again, this time to China, where Han Groo entered the Beijing International Art School. She became fluent in both English and Mandarin Chinese, while continuing to dance and engage in various activities such as horse riding, martial arts, swordsmanship, and golf. Han Groo's family stayed in China for another four years before returning to Korea.

Career
Han Groo's father is a TV commercial director and her mother used to be a professional model, which made her familiar with and naturally drawn to show business from a very early age. Upon her return to Korea, the aspiring actress signed with the management agency Climix Academy. But at her agency's suggestion, she launched a singing career in 2011 with the EP GROO ONE, followed by the single My Boy. She was nominated as Best New Female Artist at the 2011 Mnet Asian Music Awards. Han Groo later admitted that acting was her real passion from the beginning, but she had wanted to grab whatever opportunities available to her. However, she found it difficult to stand out as a singer given the huge level of competition in Korea's music industry, especially among girl groups riding the coattails of the K-pop revolution.

Later in 2011, she made her acting debut when she landed the leading role in Girl K (also known as Killer K), beating out 100 other audition hopefuls. The three-episode drama, which aired on cable channel CGV, centers on a Nikita-like character who vows to hunt down her mother's killer and joins a secret organization that trains her to become an assassin, all while attending high school. Han Groo performed most of her action stunts herself, and audiences were impressed, as Girl K ranked number one its timeslot.<ref>{{cite web|last=Choi|first=Eun-hwa|title=Girl K'''s Kim Jung Tae Praises Han Groo|url=http://mwave.interest.me/enewsworld/en/article/76/girl-ks-kim-jung-tae-praises-han-groo|work=enewsWorld|accessdate=2013-04-02|date=23 August 2011|archive-url=https://web.archive.org/web/20140529052455/http://mwave.interest.me/enewsworld/en/article/76/girl-ks-kim-jung-tae-praises-han-groo|archive-date=29 May 2014|url-status=dead}}</ref>

She then joined her first network series, the MBC daily drama Just Like Today, saying that when she read the script, she felt instantly attached because of the character's similarities to her real-life personality, someone "who's bright and positive despite her difficult situation." After supporting roles in The Scandal and One Warm Word, Han Groo returned to cable in the romantic comedies Can We Get Married? (2012) and Marriage, Not Dating'' (2014), playing female protagonists who fall for bachelors with commitment issues.

In June 2022, Han signed with SBD Entertainment, prefiguring a potential comeback in the entertainment industry after seven years away.

Personal life
Han Groo married her non-celebrity boyfriend in a private setting in November 2015. In March 2017, she gave birth to twins. On September 27, 2022, Han revealed that she divorced after 7 years of marriage. Han also decided to take custody of the twins.

Filmography

Television series

Variety show

Discography

Awards and nominations

2005 Hall of Fame Dance Challenge (USA): 2nd place, Tap
2005 Hall of Fame Dance Challenge (USA): 3rd place, Jazz
2005 Hall of Fame Dance Challenge (USA): 2nd place, Hip hop
2003 American Stage: 3rd place, Lyrical dance
2003 Starpower Dance Competition (USA): 3rd place, Tap
2003 Dancesport Dance Competition (USA): 1st place, Hip hop
2003 Showbiz Dance Competition (USA): 2nd place, Jazz
2003 Dance USA: 1st place, Hip hop

References

External links
 Han Groo at SBD Entertainment 

South Korean actresses
South Korean television actresses
1992 births
Living people
People from Namyangju
21st-century South Korean singers
21st-century South Korean women singers
Yeoheung Min clan